Andrei Stepanov (born 16 March 1979) is an Estonian former professional footballer. He played the position of defender.

Club career
2009 he received a short-term contract with Watford F.C., when manager Brendan Rodgers looked to add experience and defensive cover to his squad. On 7 April 2009 he made the league debut (and what proved to be his only appearance) for his new club as a late substitute against Southampton in a 2–2 draw. Despite playing little, Stepanov expressed satisfaction with his time at Watford. 

In February 2011, he was on a trial at Swedish Allsvenskan side Syrianska FC. On 16 March 2011, he signed a 1+1 year deal with Belarusian Premier League newcomers FC Gomel after a successful trial. He scored his first goal for Gomel on 2 April 2011, in a 1–1 draw against FC Naftan Novopolotsk.

International career
He was an Estonia national football team regular with over 80 caps to his name, and often played alongside Raio Piiroja in the national side at the heart of defense. Just like Piiroja, he joined FC Flora Tallinn under then manager Teitur Thordarson, before heading off to Russia.

Career stats

Club

Honours

Club
 FC Flora Tallinn
 Estonian Top Division: 2001, 2002, 2003
 runners up: 2000
 Estonian Cup
 runners up: 2001, 2003
 Estonian SuperCup: 2002, 2003
 FC Gomel
 Belarusian Cup: 2011

Individual
Estonian Footballer of the Year: 2004

References

External links

 
 
 
 

1979 births
Living people
Footballers from Tallinn
Estonian footballers
Estonian people of Russian descent
Estonia international footballers
Estonian expatriate footballers
Expatriate footballers in Russia
Expatriate footballers in England
Expatriate footballers in Azerbaijan
Expatriate footballers in Belarus
Expatriate footballers in Cyprus
Estonian expatriate sportspeople in Russia
Estonian expatriate sportspeople in England
Estonian expatriate sportspeople in Azerbaijan
Estonian expatriate sportspeople in Belarus
Estonian expatriate sportspeople in Cyprus
Meistriliiga players
Russian Premier League players
English Football League players
Cypriot First Division players
FC TVMK players
JK Tervis Pärnu players
FC Flora players
FC Torpedo Moscow players
FC Khimki players
Watford F.C. players
FC Gomel players
Aris Limassol FC players
Association football defenders
Neftçi PFK players